The 1887 Lafayette football team was an American football team that represented Lafayette College as an independent during the 1887 college football season. Playing without a regular coach, the team compiled a 7–2 record and outscored opponents by a total of 141 to 67. Frederick Paye was the team captain, and H. Martin was the manager. The team played its home games on The Quad in Easton, Pennsylvania.

Schedule

References

Lafayette
Lafayette Leopards football seasons
Lafayette football